Ulick John de Burgh, 1st Marquess of Clanricarde  (20 December 1802 – 10 April 1874), styled Lord Dunkellin until 1808 and The Earl of Clanricarde from 1808 until 1825, was a British Whig politician who served as British Ambassador to Russia (1838–40), Postmaster General (1846–52) and Lord Keeper of the Privy Seal (1858).

Background and education
Born at Belmont, Hampshire, Clanricarde was the son of General John de Burgh, 13th Earl of Clanricarde, and Elizabeth, daughter of Sir Thomas Burke, 1st Baronet. Henry de Burgh, 1st Marquess of Clanricarde, was his uncle. He succeeded in the earldom in July 1808 at the age of five, on the death of his father. He was educated at Eton College. Burgh was a member of the Anglican Church, like his father, although his mother was a Catholic.

Burgh was an active Freemason as a young man. While studying as an undergraduate at Christ Church, Oxford he was initiated into the Apollo University Lodge No. 711 (later No. 357) of the United Grand Lodge of England on 15 November 1820.

Political and diplomatic career

In 1825, at the age of 24, Clanricarde was created Marquess of Clanricarde in the Peerage of Ireland, a revival of the title which had become extinct on his uncle's death in 1797. The following year he was made Baron Somerhill, of Somerhill in the County of Kent, in the Peerage of the United Kingdom, which entitled him to a seat in the House of Lords. In January 1826 the Earl of Liverpool appointed him as Joint Under-Secretary of State for Foreign Affairs (alongside Lord Howard de Walden), a post he held until August of the same year. He was sworn of the Privy Council in December 1830.

Between 1838 and 1840, Lord Clanricarde served as British Ambassador to Russia. In 1846, he was appointed Postmaster General, with a seat in the cabinet, by Lord John Russell, an office he retained until the government fell in 1852. He held his last ministerial post when he was briefly Lord Keeper of the Privy Seal under Lord Palmerston for a few weeks in February 1858. Apart from his political career, he was also Lord-Lieutenant of County Galway between 1831 and 1874. In 1831, he was made a Knight of the Order of St Patrick.

Great Hunger
Burgh was a substantial landowner in County Galway, with his Norman-descended family holding their seat at Portumna. During the years of the Great Hunger in Ireland, his record was mixed. A supporter of the British Whigs and a sitting member of the Russell Ministry, his principal aim was upholding the interests of the Anglo-Irish landowning class. 

Although he did not initiate mass clearances of destitute tenants from the estates, as Palmerston and Lansdowne were notoriously known for, there were more small-scale displacements over a longer period of time. de Burgh was the Crown's Lord Lieutenant of Galway during the Famine and did not condemn the large-scale evictions by his fellow Galway landowners, John Gerrard (and his wife Marcella Netterville) at Ballinlass, Christopher St George at Connemara and Patrick Blake at Tully.

On the other hand, de Burgh highlighted in his correspondence with Russell and the Whig administration in Ireland the plight of starving tenants. He advocated a paternalistic state intervention, rather than a purely laissez-faire approach. He suggested state-sponsored public works and land drainage and sought to have corn depots set up in Loughrea and Portumna to distribute food. He donated some monies to local relief committees. de Burgh also financially assisted the emigration of poor tenants; this issue is controversial due to the fact that it still meant the displacement of the native population from the land, but supporters argue that it would have at least saved more lives (Charles Trevelyan opposed such programmes). de Burgh did not initiate any private work schemes on the estates under his control for tenants, like some neighbouring landlords, nor did he improve agriculture on the estates.

Family
Lord Clanricarde married the Hon. Harriet Canning (13 April 1804 – 8 January 1876), daughter of Prime Minister George Canning, on 4 April 1825 at Gloucester Lodge in Brompton. The couple had seven children:
Lady Elizabeth Joanna de Burgh (22 February 1826 – 26 February 1854); married Henry Lascelles, 4th Earl of Harewood
Ulick Canning de Burgh, Lord Dunkellin (12 July 1827 – 16 August 1867)
Lady Emily Charlotte de Burgh (19 October 1828 – 10 October 1912); married Richard Boyle, 9th Earl of Cork
Lady Catherine de Burgh (c. 1830 – 8 April 1895); married John Weyland, and together they had a son.
Lady Margaret Anne de Burgh (c. 1831 – 31 March 1888); married Wentworth Beaumont, 1st Baron Allendale
Hubert George de Burgh-Canning, 2nd Marquess of Clanricarde (30 November 1832 – 12 April 1916)
Lady Harriet Augusta de Burgh (c. 1834 – 18 January 1901); married Thomas Frederick Charles Vernon-Wentworth, maternal grandson Charles Brudenell-Bruce, 1st Marquess of Ailesbury. They had a son and a daughter.

Lord Clanricarde died at Stratton Street, Piccadilly, London, in April 1874, aged 71, and was succeeded in the marquessate by his second but only surviving son, Hubert. The Marchioness of Clanricarde died in January 1876, aged 71.

Honours
KP: Knight of St. Patrick, 1831
PC: Privy Counsellor, 1830–1874

Arms

Ancestry

External links

References

|-

People educated at Eton College
1802 births
1874 deaths
19th-century Anglo-Irish people
Irish Anglicans
Irish Freemasons
Freemasons of the United Grand Lodge of England
Lords Privy Seal
Lord-Lieutenants of Galway
Members of the Privy Council of the United Kingdom
Knights of St Patrick
United Kingdom Postmasters General
Diplomatic peers
Ambassadors of the United Kingdom to Russia
Burgh, 1st Marquess of Clanricarde, Ulick de
Ulick
Marquesses of Clanricarde
Peers of the United Kingdom created by George IV